Juan Carlos Plata (born 1 January 1971) is a Guatemalan soccer coach and retired football striker. He is the highest-scoring player in the history of Guatemala's top division. As of January 2010, Plata has, except for Marc Lloyd-Williams, been the most prolific scorer among all active players in the world in top division leagues, and is among the top 60 goalscorers of all time in the world according to the International Federation of Football History & Statistics.

He is also the second-highest goalscorer in the history of the Guatemala national team behind Carlos Ruiz.

Plata played all of his professional club career for CSD Municipal and is also the all-time top goalscorer for that club; he has broken virtually every scoring record associated with professional football in Guatemala. He also has won 15 domestic league titles, 5 domestic cup titles, and 2 international titles playing for Municipal.

Playing style
Plata was not a very physically gifted player, but he was a technical player with a good sense of positioning and playing without the ball. He was not only a good finisher but he could also be a creative playmaker and passer. His personal-best 33 goals in one season came at age 35, a testament to his reliance on intelligent play instead of pure athletic ability.

Club career
Plata, born in Guatemala City, made his debut in the Liga Mayor (Major League, now Liga Nacional) in the 1990–1991 league season, won by Municipal, under coach Rubén Amorín. He has since been a regular for the club, and has helped them win 14 league titles, 5 domestic cups, and 2 Central American championships.

A consistent goalscorer throughout his career, Plata has scored at least 15 goals in 13 different seasons, with his most prolific season in terms of total goals scored being 2005–2006, when he scored 32 goals in total for both the Torneo de Apertura and the Torneo de Clausura.

On 15 February 2008, Plata played his 500th official match with Municipal against Deportivo Zacapa for the domestic league.
On 17 May 2009, Plata scored his 400th career goal against Deportivo Petapa.

Notable goals
Plata holds the domestic record for most goals scored in finals. Some of his most memorable performances include scoring 4 goals in a 9–2 beatdown over rival team CSD Comunicaciones in the Apertura 2004 final. He also scored 2 late goals in the Apertura 2005 championship over Comunicaciones to win the title. In the Clausura 2005 final, he scored a record 4 goals in one game against CD Suchitepequez to win another title. His latest final was against Xelajú MC in the Clausura 2010 tournament, coming in as a late substitute after being inactive for the majority of the tournament due to a major injury and scoring a header which gave Municipal its third goal in an eventual 3–1 victory. In the second game he again came in as a late substitute and again scored a goal to add a second goal to a 7–1 aggregate victory and his fifteenth league title with Municipal.

He also holds the domestic record of most goals scored in the Guatemalan derby (Municipal vs. Comunicaciones) with 39, all scored with Municipal against Comunicaciones. Further, he holds the record for most goals scored in international club competitions by a Guatemalan with 33.

International career
He made his debut for Guatemala as a second half substitute for Jorge Rodas in a January 1996 CONCACAF Gold Cup match against Mexico and scored 35 international goals in 86 international matches. He played in the World Cup qualification processes of 1998, 2002 and 2006, scoring 7 goals in 27 World Cup qualification matches, including 2 in a 2–1 win against Costa Rica on 5 September 2004 that helped Guatemala advance to the final stage of the 2006 CONCACAF World Cup qualification.

On 21 January 2002 he scored his 26th goal with the national team, against Mexico at the 2002 Gold Cup, surpassing the record of 25 that had been held by Carlos Toledo since 1953. Plata's most famous goal with the national team, however, might be the one he scored in the dying seconds of the 1998 CONCACAF Gold Cup match against Brazil, a header from a corner kick to equalize the score 1–1, a very surprising result considering Brazil were the reigning world champions at the time and fielded stars like Romario, Mauro Silva, Edmundo, Denilson and Taffarel.

El Pin retired from international play in 2006, after a friendly match against Panama. He did however earn a final cap in a testimonial match against Belize on 9 October 2010 in which he came on as a second-half substitute.

Coaching career 
He started his coaching career in October 2012 as an assistant coach for Ramon Maradiaga in CSD Municipal, and continued in the assistant coach position in the Club until December 2015. In January 2016 he joined Walter Claveri to be assistant coach for Guatemala's National Team.

In March 2017 he made his debut as coach with CSD Mixco in the Primera Division de Ascenso.

Honours

Municipal
Liga Nacional de Guatemala:
 1992, 1994, Apertura 2000, Clausura 2000, Apertura 2001, Clausura 2002, Apertura 2003, Apertura 2004, Clausura 2005, Apertura 2005, Clausura 2006, Apertura 2006, Clausura 2008, Apertura 2009, Clausura 2010

Domestic Cup:
 1994, 1995, 1998, 2003, 2004

UNCAF Interclub Cup:
 2001, 2004

Liga Nacional de Guatemala Top Goalscorer: 
 1996, 2005

Biography on film

Juan Carlos Plata's career received a tribute with the release in Guatemala of his biographic documentary film 321: Juan Carlos Plata on 16 February 2006. The 94-minute film makes emphasis on the scoring of goal 321, which gave Plata the record as top goal scorer in the history of professional Guatemalan football. It also covers his ongoing career as well as non-sport related subjects, such as family and business. The premiere took place at the Centro Cultural Miguel Ángel Asturias (national theatre), with over 2000 people in attendance. The documentary and other additional features, are included in a DVD which includes over 200 of his career goals and was released for sale to the public on the night of the film's premiere.

Retirement from active career and number retirement
On 19 December 2010 Juan Carlos Plata played his last official game as a professional player in Guatemala, as a substitute in the final match for Apertura 2011, a series defining the national championship between CSD Municipal and Comunicaciones. The match ended in a draw 2–2 (being 3–3 the global score), so there was the need to define the championship on penalty series. At that time he scored a goal, however his team lost dramatically, he retired being a national Second Place.

On 9 January 2011 Juan Carlos Plata received a tribute and played a friendly match between his team CSD Municipal and an informal team composed by former and active players (all of them played at least once with Juan Carlos Plata either in CSD Municipal or Guatemalan national team), named "Estrellas de Plata" (Plata's Stars). Right after the match completion, the number 15, which was used by Juan Carlos Plata during his whole career, was officially retired from CSD Municipal, being the first and only soccer player in Guatemala who is granted with this honour, thus he forms part of the Retired numbers in association football.

Further reading

Personal life
Plata was born to a family of five brothers and one sister in Guatemala City. Before becoming a professional footballer Plata quit school early to be a baker and help his family. Plata is married to Paty Francisco and has three children: Juan Carlos, Juan de Marco, and Ivan. Plata was born with Polydactyly, he has two thumbs on his left hand.

References and footnotes

External links
 Dedicated web site
  Player profile – CSD Municipal
  Player profile – Terra.com
  Player profile – deGuate.com
 
 Todos los goles del Pin Plata – LaRed Deportiva  (All goals of Juan Carlos Plata)

1971 births
Living people
Sportspeople from Guatemala City
Guatemalan people of Maya descent
C.S.D. Municipal players
Guatemalan footballers
Guatemala international footballers
1996 CONCACAF Gold Cup players
1998 CONCACAF Gold Cup players
2000 CONCACAF Gold Cup players
2002 CONCACAF Gold Cup players
2003 CONCACAF Gold Cup players
2005 UNCAF Nations Cup players
Association football forwards